Bob Bryan and Mike Bryan were the defending champions, but they competed in Scottsdale this week.

David Ferrer and Santiago Ventura won the title by defeating Jiří Vaněk and Tomáš Zíb 4–6, 6–1, 6–4 in the final.

Seeds

Draw

Draw

References
 Main Draw

2005 Abierto Mexicano Telcel
Abierto Mexicano Telcel